Xenia is a city  in southwestern Ohio and the county seat of Greene County, Ohio, United States. The name comes from the Greek word Xenia (ξενία), which means "hospitality".

As of the United States Census 2020, the city had a population of 25,441.  As of the United States Census 2010, Xenia is the third-largest city by population in Greene County, behind Fairborn and Beavercreek. At the geographical center of the county, it is the county seat and houses the County Courthouse, County Sheriff's Department, Jail, and other regional departments.

History

Xenia was founded in 1803, the same year Ohio was admitted to the Union. In that year, European-American pioneer John Paul bought  of land from Thomas and Elizabeth Richardson of Hanover County, Virginia, for "1050 pounds current moneys of Virginia." Paul influenced county commissioners to locate the county seat on this land at the forks of the Shawnee creeks, stimulating development of the settlement here.

Joseph C. Vance was named to survey the site and lay out the town. The name of the new village was chosen in typically democratic fashion. Vance called a town meeting to discuss possible names. The committee had considered several suggestions without reaching any decision. Then the Rev. Robert Armstrong proposed the name "Xenia," meaning "hospitality" in Greek, because of the fine hospitality extended to him in this friendly community. When a tie vote occurred, Laticia Davis, wife of Owen Davis, was invited to cast the deciding ballot. She voted for "Xenia."

The first session of the Ohio General Assembly created Greene County from the Northwest Territory. It took in the homeland of the Shawnee Indians. Their chief tribal village was north of Xenia at Old Chillicothe, now called Old Town. The Shawnee war chief Tecumseh was born there in 1768. The Catawba also lived in and around Xenia, many of their descendants, such as the Jeffries family intermarried with the local free Black community and the White community as well.  

William Beattie was Xenia's first businessman. In 1804, he opened a tavern which became a center of community affairs. In 1804, John Marshall built Xenia's first house. The first log school house was constructed in 1805, and, that same year, the Rev. James Towler became the town's first postmaster. The growing community soon attracted many pioneer industries - flour mills, sawmills, woolen mills, pork packing plants, oil mills, and tow mills.

A petition for incorporation, dated March 24, 1817, was circulated among the 88 households of Xenia, and on July 21, 1817, that petition, containing 66 signatures, was filed with the Court of Common Pleas of Greene County.  On October 27, 1817, the petition for incorporation was granted by the Court and Xenia became a municipal corporation.

The arrival of the Little Miami Railroad (now the site of the Little Miami Scenic Trail, which passed through Xenia Station) in 1843, stimulated the development of additional industries and connected the city to other markets. On March 2, 1850, the Ohio General Assembly rode from Columbus, Ohio to Xenia and back on the newly completed Columbus and Xenia Railroad.

From the summer of 1851, tourists would come from Cincinnati, as well as plantations from the South, to visit the nearby Xenia Springs and Tawawa House, a hotel and health spa about three miles away. It was established as a summer resort to draw on interest in the medicinal properties of the springs. Skin specialist Dr. Samuel Spilsbee from Cincinnati served as Superintendent of the hotel. It was three stories high, and the grounds of the complex also included separate cottages. After it went out of business, the complex was purchased for use as Wilberforce College, a historically black college founded by a collaboration between the African Methodist Episcopal Church (AME) and the Cincinnati Conference of the Methodist Church. By 1860 most of the 200 students were mixed-race children of wealthy white fathers from the South, planters and businessmen who were prevented from getting them educated there. In the early years of the war, the college closed briefly after Southerners withdrew their children. The AME Church took it over, and continued to operate it.

On Wednesday morning, February 13, 1861, President-Elect Abraham Lincoln made a brief appearance in the city as his inaugural train traveled from Cincinnati east to Columbus. He gave a short speech; the traveling reporter from the New York Times did not record it as Lincoln expressed sentiments that he had repeated in previous stops. According to the Times writer, "a very large crowd assembled, and amid the firing of a cannon and enthusiasm, Mr. Lincoln addressed them from the rear car, reiterating what he had said before.".

The town progressed rapidly during the mid-19th century. Artificial gas was provided in the 1840s and continued in use until natural gas was made available in 1905. The first fire engine house was built in 1831; the telephone came to Xenia in 1879; electricity in 1881 and a water works system in 1886. Xenia opened its first free public library in 1899. By 1900, the city was operating its own sewage system.

Following the Civil War, the Ohio Soldiers' and Sailors' Orphans' Home was built in Xenia. Some of its building remains in use by a Christian ministry organization.

Xenia elected Cornelius Clark as its first mayor in 1834. On January 1, 1918, the current city commission-manager plan succeeded the old form of municipal government.

Tornadoes
Xenia has a history of severe storm activity. According to local legend, the Shawnee referred to the area as "the place of the devil wind" or "the land of the crazy winds" (depending upon the translation).

On April 3, 1974, a tornado rated F5 on the Fujita scale cut a path directly through the middle of Xenia during the 1974 Super Outbreak, the second largest series of tornadoes in recorded history. The disaster killed 34 people (including two Ohio National Guardsmen who died days later in a related fire), injured an additional 1,150, destroyed almost half of the city's buildings, and left 10,000 people homeless. Five schools, including Xenia High School, Central Junior High School, McKinley Elementary, Simon Kenton Elementary, and Saint Brigid Catholic School were destroyed, as were nine churches and 180 businesses. Ted Fujita himself rated the tornado an F6 in an essay he wrote, but the rating was never confirmed.

The city's plight was featured in the national news, including a 1974 NBC television documentary, Tornado!, hosted by Floyd Kalber. President Richard Nixon visited stricken areas of Xenia following the devastation. Comedian Bob Hope organized a benefit to raise funds for Xenia and, in appreciation, the new Xenia High School Auditorium was named the "Bob Hope Auditorium." In recognition of their coverage of this tornado, the staff of the Xenia Daily Gazette won the Pulitzer Prize for Spot News Reporting in 1975.

Xenia was struck by an F2 tornado on April 25, 1989, and again by an F4 tornado on September 20, 2000. The 1989 tornado caused over $2 million in damage, but no one was killed. The twister of 2000 killed one person, and injured 100 people. This tornado followed a path roughly parallel to that of the 1974 tornado.

Xenia currently has a system of tornado sirens. After the 1974 tornado outbreak, the city purchased a system of five Federal Signal Thunderbolt sirens for warning. During the 2000 tornado strike, the lack of backup power silenced the Thunderbolts, so the city purchased five Federal Signal 2001-SRNB series sirens with battery backup to reinforce/replace the Thunderbolts.

Railroads

Several railroad lines owned by the Baltimore & Ohio (B&O) and Pennsylvania (PRR) railroads once served Xenia, for both freight and passenger service. Since restructuring of the railroad industry in the mid-twentieth century, all lines have since been abandoned, the last being dismantled by 1989.

The lines that previously served Xenia were:
 B&O Wellston subdivision, between Washington Court House and Dayton.
 PRR Little Miami branch, between Cincinnati and Springfield; a portion of the line ran down Detroit Street and was the first section to be dismantled.
 PRR Pittsburgh-St. Louis mainline; Amtrak operated the National Limited passenger service over this line until 1979.

The roadbeds of five of Xenia's six rail lines were converted for rail trail use. The one exception — the B&O line west of town — was not converted because it closely paralleled the PRR mainline for most of its length.

Xenia was served by two interurban railways until the 1940s:
 Dayton & Xenia Transit Company
 Springfield & Xenia Railway
In the postwar period, automobile ownership increased, and the federal government subsidized the construction of numerous interstate highways. Both changes influenced the decline of regional transit, such as the interurban railways.

Geography
Today Xenia is centrally located in the "transportation triangle" formed by three major interstate highways: I-70, I-71, and I-75. These north-south, east–west arteries are within minutes of Xenia via U.S. Routes 35, 42, and 68, tying the community to one of the nation's largest 90-minute highway markets. Before the creation of the U.S. Interstate Highway system, U.S. 68 was one of the main southward routes from the major city of Detroit, Michigan. Within Xenia, U.S. 68 is named "Detroit Street".

Climate

Demographics

2010 census
As of the census of 2010, there were 25,719 people, 10,390 households, and 6,631 families residing in the city. The racial makeup of the city was 82.0% White, 13.4% African American, 0.4% Native American, 0.5% Asian, 0.5% from other races, and 3.2% from two or more races. Hispanic or Latino of any race were 1.7% of the population.

There were 10,390 households, of which 32.3% had children under the age of 18 living with them, 42.6% were married couples living together, 16.3% had a female householder with no husband present, 4.9% had a male householder with no wife present, and 36.2% were non-families. 31.0% of all households were made up of individuals, and 12.9% had someone living alone who was 65 years of age or older. The average household size was 2.39 and the average family size was 2.98.

The median age in the city was 37.1 years. 24.8% of residents were under the age of 18; 9.1% were between the ages of 18 and 24; 25.6% were from 25 to 44; 24.9% were from 45 to 64; and 15.7% were 65 years of age or older. The gender makeup of the city was 47.2% male and 52.8% female.

2000 census
As of the census of 2000, there were 24,164 people, 9,378 households, and 6,527 families residing in the city. The population density was 1,989.3 people per square mile (767.9/km2). There were 9,924 dwelling units at an average density of 817.0 per square mile (315.4/km2). The racial makeup of the city was 83.30% White, 13.51% African American, 0.34% Native American, 0.29% Asian, 0.05% Pacific Islander, 0.53% from other races, and 1.98% from two or more races. Hispanic or Latino of any race were 1.09% of the population.

There were 9,378 households, out of which 34.2% had children under the age of 18 living with them, 50.2% were married couples living together, 15.5% had a female householder with no husband present, and 30.4% were non-families. 26.2% of all households were made up of individuals, and 11.1% had someone living alone who was 65 years of age or older. The average household size was 2.51 and the average family size was 3.02.

In the city the population was spread out, with 27.1% under the age of 18, 9.6% from 18 to 24, 28.5% from 25 to 44, 21.3% from 45 to 64, and 13.5% who were 65 years of age or older. The median age was 34 years. For every 100 females, there were 90.5 males. For every 100 females age 18 and over, there were 84.4 males.

The median income for a household in the city was $36,457, and the median income for a family was $43,046. Males had a median income of $34,497 versus $24,094 for females. The per capita income for the city was $16,481. About 8.9% of families and 11.6% of the population were below the poverty line, including 14.8% of those under age 18 and 9.4% of those age 65 or over.

Economy
Xenia has, or once had, the following industries:
 Hooven and Allison rope factory (1870-2003)
 Xenia Shoe Manufacturing
 Xenia Ironcasting Foundry (founded 1920)
 Bob Evans Restaurants meat packing plant
 Xenia Workhouse
 Kroehler Furniture factory (destroyed 1974)
 McDonald Farm Stone Quarry - stone used to represent Ohio in the Washington Monument
 Dodds Monuments - grave and memorial sculptors (founded 1864)
 Eavey Grocers (1865-1970)

Arts and culture
From May 2017 the annual Dayton Hamvention will be held at the Greene County Fairgrounds, having moved from the now closed Hara Arena in Trotwood, Ohio.  This event typically attracts over 20,000 amateur radio enthusiasts from around the world.

Government
The Xenia City Council exercises the powers and authority of a municipal corporation as determined by the constitution of the State of Ohio and the Charter and ordinances of the City of Xenia. The City Council is composed of seven elected council members, including one mayor. Council members are each elected for one four-year term of office.

City Council members and term start years:
 Mayor Sarah Mays
 Councilman and City Council President Wesley Smith
 Councilman and City Council Vice President Levi Dean
 Councilman Thomas Scrivens
 Councilwoman Rebekah Dean
 Councilman Cody Brannum
 Councilman William Urschel

The City Manager is Brent Merriman.

Education
The Xenia Community School District has 1 preschool, 5 elementary, 1 middle, and 1 high school:

 Xenia Preschool (formerly Central Middle School) (Grade PreK)
 Cox Elementary School (Grade K-5)
 McKinley Elementary School (Grade K-5)
 Arrowood Elementary (Grade K-5)
 Shawnee Elementary (Grade K-5)
 Tecumseh Elementary (Grade K-5)
 Warner Middle School (Grade 6–8)
 Xenia High School (Grade 9–12)
 Spring Hill Elementary (as of 2012 defunct)

Private schools in Xenia:
 Legacy Christian Academy (Grade Pre-K-12)
 St. Brigid School (Grade Pre-K-8)

Xenia has the main branch library and administrative offices of the Greene County Public Library.

Media
Xenia is part of the Dayton media market, the 64th-largest media market in the United States.

Newspapers
The main newspaper in Xenia is the Xenia Daily Gazette, founded in 1868. The Gazette is published six days a week. A community-based online source, Xenia's Word on the Street, is also available. The larger Dayton Daily News, which covers the entire Dayton metro area, includes a community section for Xenia in both the printed and online versions. In February 2023, it was announced that the Gazette would reduce "the number of printed editions each week while expanding local news coverage" on their website due to inflationary costs.

Radio
Radio stations based in Xenia:
1500 AM WBZI "Real Roots Radio" (simulcasts on F.M. translator 100.3/W262BG)
95.3 FM WZLR "The Eagle" (Classic Rock)

Notable people
 Doug Adair, television news anchor and journalist
 Doug Adams, NFL player
 Steve Austria, U.S. Congressman
 Elizabeth Gowdy Baker, painter
 Una Mae Carlisle, jazz musician
 Dean Chenoweth, hydroplane and auto racer in Motorsports Hall of Fame of America
 John Barry Clemens, NBA player
 Trent Cole, NFL defensive end
 Lloyd Gearhart, MLB player and scout
 Charley Grapewin, actor
 Caitlin Halligan, lawyer and nominee for federal judge
 Chris Hero, pro wrestler for WWE and NXT
 Roger Huston, harness race caller
 Coates Kinney, lawyer, journalist, and poet
 John Little, U.S. Congressman
 Roger McMurrin, conductor
 Rose Murphy, jazz singer
 Larry D. Nichols, puzzle enthusiast and inventor of Pocket Cube
 Aftab Pureval, Mayor of Cincinnati
 Helen Hooven Santmyer, novelist
 Obiwu, poet and author
 Arthur M. Schlesinger, Sr., historian
 Chief Tecumseh, Shawnee Chief during the War of 1812
 Thomas Taggart, Mayor of Indianapolis and U.S. Senator from Indiana
 Ridgely Torrence, poet
 Sarah A. Worden (1855-1918), painter, art instructor

In popular culture

Film
 Xenia is the setting for Harmony Korine's film Gummo (1997); the movie was not filmed in Xenia, however, but in Korine's hometown of Nashville, Tennessee.

Music
 Maynard James Keenan mentions Xenia at least twice with his band Puscifer, first in "Sour Grapes (Where is the Line Mix)", and again in a fictional documentary played before shows on their 2011 tour. The Puscifer Characters Billy Dee Burger and Hildy Burger are credited as being from Xenia.
 They Might Be Giants mention Xenia in the song "Out of Jail" on their album John Henry (1994).
 The Breeders mention Xenia, as well as Akron, Ohio, in the song "Little Fury" on their album Title TK (2002).

See also
Alexander Conner House
Bank of Xenia
East Second Street Historic District (Xenia, Ohio)
Greene County–Lewis A. Jackson Regional Airport
Hollencamp House
Millen-Schmidt House
Ohio Town
Samuel N. Patterson House
Xenia (automobile)

References

External links

 

 
Cities in Ohio
Cities in Greene County, Ohio
County seats in Ohio
Populated places established in 1803
Populated places on the Underground Railroad
1803 establishments in Ohio